Lubbock Preston Smith International Airport  is five miles north of Lubbock, in Lubbock County, Texas, United States. Originally Lubbock International Airport, it was renamed in 2004 for former Texas governor Preston E. Smith, an alumnus of Texas Tech University.

The National Plan of Integrated Airport Systems for 2011–2015 classifies it as a primary commercial service airport. Federal Aviation Administration records say the airport had 520,181 passenger boardings (enplanements) in calendar year 2019, and 487,000 in 2018.

The airport is the eighth-busiest airport in Texas. Lubbock International is first among the smaller Texas cities (behind both Dallas airports, both Houston airports, San Antonio, Austin, and El Paso). It is one of 42 airports around the world with CNN Airport Network. Lubbock Preston Smith International Airport is a hub for FedEx and UPS feeder planes to cities around the South Plains.

History
The airport opened in November 1937 as South Plains Airport. In 1942 the United States Army Air Forces indicated a need for the airport as a training airfield. After its requisition by the Air Force, it was assigned to the World War II Army Air Forces Flying Training Command, Gulf Coast Training Center (later Central Flying Training Command). The airport was renamed South Plains Army Airfield and a rapid period of construction was begun to convert the civil airport into a military training airfield.

Construction involved runways and airplane hangars, with three concrete runways, several taxiways and a large apron and a control tower. Several large hangars were also built. Buildings were utilitarian and quickly assembled. Most base buildings, not meant for long-term use, were of temporary or semi-permanent materials. Some hangars had steel frames and the occasional brick or tile brick building could be seen, but most support buildings had concrete foundations and frame construction clad in little more than plywood and tarpaper.

The base was activated on September 11, 1942, as the South Plains Flying School. The mission was ground and flying training of glider pilots. Glider training was performed by the 848th School Squadron (Special), with overall training being under the 64th Two-Engine Flying Training Group of the 80th Flying Training Wing. Aircraft assigned were Douglas C-47 Skytrains and Waco CG-4A gliders. The CG-4A was the USAAF's primary glider, consisting of little more than a wooden and fabric shell, equipped with radio, wheels, and brakes. Glider pilots trained at South Plains flew these craft in combat during the Normandy Invasion, Operation Market-Garden, and also Operation Varsity, the airborne invasion of Germany.

By late 1944 Flying Training Command ended all glider instruction, and control of South Plains AAF was transferred to the Air Service Command at Tinker Field, Oklahoma. Under Air Service Command, South Plains became a maintenance and supply depot for excess aircraft that could not be accommodated at Tinker. After the war ended, in 1946 and 1947, South Plains was used as a storage facility for excess aircraft prior to their reclamation.

Military use of South Plains ended on December 1, 1947, and it was returned to the local government for civil use. A civilian terminal was constructed on the southwest corner of the airfield for commercial airline activity and used through the 1950s and 1960s. The current airline terminal was opened about 1976. The original terminal now houses the Silent Wings Museum dedicated to World War II glider pilots. 

Major renovations to the terminal building began in 2019, featuring an expanded TSA screening area, refreshed check-in counters, gates, waiting areas, restrooms, concessions, rental-car desks and more. Many of these improvements began to open to the public in late 2021.

Historical airline service

Braniff Airways, later to be Braniff International Airways, scheduled passenger flights to Lubbock by 1945.  Continental Airlines scheduled passenger service to Lubbock by 1948.

Airline jets arrived in 1965 on Braniff International Airways and 1966 on Continental Airlines. In spring 1966 Braniff BAC One-Elevens flew nonstop to Dallas Love Field and Amarillo, in addition to Lockheed L-188 Electra and Convair 340 flights, while Continental Douglas DC-9-10s flew nonstop to Dallas Love Field and El Paso in addition to Vickers Viscount flights. Trans-Texas Airways Convair 240s and Douglas DC-3s also served Lubbock.

By 1976 all scheduled passenger airline flights at Lubbock were jets: Braniff Boeing 727-100s and Boeing 727-200s, Continental 727-200s and Texas International Airlines Douglas DC-9-10s, the latter being the renamed Trans-Texas Airways. A 1976 OAG lists nonstop jets to Lubbock from Albuquerque, Amarillo, Austin, Dallas/Fort Worth (DFW), El Paso, Midland/Odessa and Wichita Falls and direct jets from Colorado Springs, Corpus Christi, Denver, Houston (IAH), Lawton, Los Angeles (LAX), Oklahoma City, San Antonio and Tulsa. Braniff Boeing 727s flew direct from Lubbock to New York Newark Airport, Washington D.C. National Airport and Nashville.

Southwest Airlines began serving Lubbock on May 20, 1977, as an intrastate airline with Boeing 737-200s to Dallas Love Field, Houston Hobby Airport, San Antonio, Corpus Christi and Harlingen.  By 1978 Southwest had added nonstop 737 jet flights to El Paso in addition to nonstop jets to Dallas Love Field and Houston Hobby Airport and direct jets to other Texas cities. In 1983 Muse Air McDonnell Douglas MD-80s were flying nonstop to Dallas Love Field, Houston Hobby Airport and Los Angeles (LAX).  American Airlines and Delta Air Lines were serving Lubbock by 1985, both flying nonstop to Dallas/Fort Worth Airport (DFW) and Amarillo, American with 727-200s and Delta with 737-200s.  That year Aspen Airways BAe 146-100s and Convair 580s were flying direct from Denver via Amarillo.  In 1989 American, Delta and Southwest flights continued, joined by America West Airlines Boeing 737-200s nonstop from Phoenix and Midland/Odessa.

Facilities
It has three runways: 17R/35L is  concrete; 8/26 is  concrete; 17L/35R is  asphalt.

In the year ending May 31, 2022 the airport had 92,881 aircraft operations, average 254 per day: 55% general aviation, 17% air taxi, 14% airline, and 14% military. 156 aircraft were then based at this airport: 100 single-engine, 35 multi-engine, 19 jet, and 2 helicopter.

Airlines and destinations

Passenger

Cargo

Statistics

Top destinations

Accidents and incidents
 On July 8, 1962 Vickers Viscount N243V of Continental Airlines was damaged beyond economic repair when the propellers struck the runway shortly after take-off. A wheels-up landing was made in a wheat field.
 On January 27, 2009, Empire Airlines Flight 8284, an ATR 42 under contract from FedEx Express, crashed on landing at Lubbock Preston Smith International Airport at 04:37 CT. The plane, which had been traveling from Fort Worth Alliance Airport, landed short of the touchdown zone and skidded off the runway amid light freezing rain. There was a small fire on the plane and two crew members were taken to hospital with minor injuries.
 On February 4, 2015, a Piper PA-46, during the landing approach, struck a KCBD transmitter 8 miles south of the airport. The sole occupant was killed.
 On October 26, 2020, a Cessna 210 crashed 5 miles short of the runway while attempting to land in adverse weather. The pilot and sole occupant of the aircraft was killed in the accident.

See also

 Texas World War II Army Airfields
 Silent Wings Museum

References

External links
 Lubbock Preston Smith International Airport, official site
 
 Lubbock Preston Smith International (LBB) at Texas DOT airport directory
 Aerial image as of March 2002 from USGS The National Map
 
 

Airports in Texas
Preston Smith International Airport
Transportation in Lubbock County, Texas
Buildings and structures in Lubbock County, Texas
Airports established in 1937
Airfields of the United States Army Air Forces in Texas
USAAF Glider Training Airfields
USAAF Contract Flying School Airfields
USAAF Central Flying Training Command
American Theater of World War II
Military in Lubbock, Texas
1937 establishments in Texas